Lhomme is a surname. Notable people with the surname include:

 Fabrice Lhomme (born 1965), French investigative journalist
 Pierre Lhomme (1930–2019), French cinematographer and filmmaker
 Stéphane Lhomme (born 1965), French anti-nuclear activist

See also
 Homme (surname)